Brigitte Prass (born 23 June 1963) is a Romanian breaststroke swimmer. She competed in three events at the 1980 Summer Olympics.

References

External links
 

1963 births
Living people
Romanian female breaststroke swimmers
Olympic swimmers of Romania
Swimmers at the 1980 Summer Olympics
Sportspeople from Reșița
Universiade medalists in swimming
Universiade silver medalists for Romania